Erythrolamprus trebbaui is a species of snake in the family Colubridae. The species is found in Venezuela and Brazil.

References

Erythrolamprus
Reptiles of Venezuela
Reptiles of Brazil
Reptiles described in 1958
Taxa named by Janis Roze